NA-246 Karachi West-III is a constituency for the National Assembly of Pakistan that encompasses Orangi.

Members of Parliament

2018-2022: NA-251 Karachi West-IV

Election 2002 

General elections were held on 10 Oct 2002. Muhammad Abdul Rauf Siddiqui of Muttahida Qaumi Movement won by 62,690 votes.

Election 2008 

General elections were held on 18 Feb 2008. Dr Abdul Qadir Khanzada of Muttahida Qaumi Movement won by 147,892 votes.

Election 2013 

General elections were held on 11 May 2013. Mehboob Alam of Muttahida Qaumi Movement won by 166,836 votes and became the member of National Assembly.

Election 2018 

General elections were held on 25 July 2018.

†MQM-P is considered heir apparent to MQM

See also
NA-245 Karachi West-II
NA-247 Karachi Central-I

References

External links 
Election result's official website

NA-242
Karachi